Melissa Maclean is an Australian film maker. Her 2008 documentary film, Beyond Our Ken garnered Maclean a nomination for the AACTA Award for Best Direction in a Documentary (shared with co-director Luke Walker). Beyond Our Ken was also nominated for Best Documentary at the Film Critics Circle of Australia Awards and also by the Australian Film Institute. Melissa is also a factual, reality and light entertainment show runner. She co-created the factual entertainment series, Parental Guidance for Nine in 2021. 

Maclean is a graduate of the Victorian College of the Arts.

References

External links
 

Living people
Australian filmmakers
Year of birth missing (living people)